Empress Xiao'an (孝安皇后; died 6 August 1596), of the Chen clan, was a Chinese empress consort of the Ming dynasty. She was the second wife of the Longqing Emperor.

Her father, Chen Jingxing (陳景行), was an imperial guard.

Biography 
The future emperor Longqing married Lady Chen after the death of his first primary spouse and son. Upon his succession to the throne in 1567, he declared Chen to be his empress. In 1569, however, she lost favor with the emperor and was moved to a separate palace. She became ill after her move, and was not given proper care. When an official pointed this out to the emperor, he stated that empress Chen was prone to illness and did not have any son and therefore had to be removed, and that the official did not understand his domestic affairs. Another reason for her removal was reportedly that she had at one occasion made the emperor angry by criticizing his indulgence in women and music. 

Chen, however, were kindly treated by the crown prince, who took to habit of always visiting her on his way to his father and mother. When the crown prince became emperor in 1572, he granted her as well as his mother the title of empress dowager, and reportedly always treated her with the respect a son was due to his mother, as was customary for a son to the main spouse of his father.

Titles 
During the reign of the Jiajing Emperor (r. 1521–1567):
Lady Chen (陳氏)
Princess of Yu (裕王妃; from 1558)
During the reign of the Longqing Emperor (r.1567–1572):
Empress (皇后; from 4 February 1567)
During the reign of the Wanli Emperor (r. 1572–1620): 
Empress Dowager Rensheng (仁聖皇太后; from 19 July 1572)
Empress Dowager Rensheng Zhenyi (仁聖貞懿皇太后; from 1578)
Empress Dowager Rensheng Zhenyi Kangjing (仁聖貞懿康靜皇太后; from 1582)
''Empress Xiao'an Zhenyi Gongchun Wenhui Zuotian Hongsheng (孝安貞懿恭純溫惠佐天弘聖皇后; from 1596)

Issue 
As Lady Chen: 
Princess Taihe (太和公主; 1557–1560), the Longqing Emperor's second daughter

References

 Keith McMahon: Celestial Women: Imperial Wives and Concubines in China from Song to Qing
Zhang Tingyu, Ming Shi,Vol 114: Biography II: Empress II

Year of birth unknown
1596 deaths
Ming dynasty empresses
Ming dynasty empresses dowager
16th-century Chinese women
16th-century Chinese people
People from Tongzhou